Aki Takayama (born March 12, 1970) is a former competitor in synchronised swimming from Japan.

Aki won a bronze medal in the women's duet event at the 1992 Summer Olympics with Fumiko Okuno.

References 

1970 births
Living people
Japanese synchronized swimmers
Olympic bronze medalists for Japan
Olympic synchronized swimmers of Japan
Synchronized swimmers at the 1992 Summer Olympics
People from Ōsakasayama, Osaka
Olympic medalists in synchronized swimming
World Aquatics Championships medalists in synchronised swimming
Synchronized swimmers at the 1986 World Aquatics Championships
Synchronized swimmers at the 1991 World Aquatics Championships
Medalists at the 1992 Summer Olympics
20th-century Japanese women